The Beary Family (also known as The Beary's Family Album) is an American animated series and cartoon animal theatrical series made by Walter Lantz Studios. Twenty eight shorts were made from 1962 to 1972, when the studio closed. The series was about Charlie Beary, the incompetent family man, his nagging wife Bessie, their well-meaning but half-witted teenage son Junior and their younger daughter Suzy, who later got a pet goose who never gets along with Charlie.

Voice actors
 Paul Frees – Charlie and Junior Beary
 Grace Stafford – Bessie and Suzy Beary
 Nancy Wible – Suzy Beary ("Fowled-Up Birthday")

Filmography
 "Fowled-Up Birthday" (1962-04-09)
 "Mother's Little Helper" (1962-06-18)
 "Charlie's Mother-In-Law" (1963-04-12)
 "Goose in the Rough" (1963-08-02)
 "Goose is Wild" (1963-10-25)
 "Rah Rah Ruckus" (1964-06-05)
 "Roof Top Razzle-Dazzle" (1964-10-09)
 "Guest Who?" (1965-05-01)
 "Davey Cricket" (1965-07-17)
 "Foot Brawl" (1966-01-29)
"Window Pains" (1967-02-25)
"Mouse in the House" (1967-06-19)
"Jerky Turkey" (1968-01-29)
"Paste Makes Waste" (1968-07-15)
"Bugged in a Rug" (1968-08-26)
"Gopher Broke" (1969-02-10)
"Charlie's Campout" (1969-07-28)
"Cool it Charlie" (1969-09-29)
"Charlie in Hot Water" (1970-02-09)
"Charlie's Golf Classic" (1970-05-11)
"The Unhandy Man" (1970-09-14)
"Charlie the Rain Maker" (1971-02-22)
"The Bungling Builder" (1971-06-28)
"Moochin Pooch" (1971-12-13)
"Let Charlie Do It" (1972-02-14)
"A Fish Story" (1972-03-27)
"Rain, Rain, Go Away" (1972-05-29)
"Unlucky Potluck" (1972-09-11)

See also 
 Walter Lantz
 Walter Lantz Productions
 List of Walter Lantz cartoon characters
 Woody Woodpecker
 Andy Panda
 Chilly Willy

References

External links
 The Beary Family profile
 The Walter Lantz-o-Pedia
 Walter Lantz Productions cartoons @ BCDB.com

Animated films about bears
Animated films about families
Fictional anthropomorphic characters
Universal Pictures cartoons and characters
Walter Lantz Productions shorts
Walter Lantz Productions cartoons and characters
Film characters introduced in 1962